Maa Nannaku Pelli is a 1997 Telugu-language drama film starring Krishnam Raju, Srikanth, Simran and Ambika. The film won two Nandi Awards. The film was a breakthrough for M. S. Narayana. It was the first Telugu film to be shot entirely at the Ramoji Film City.

Plot
Balaraju (Srikanth) is the only son of Raghava Raju (Krishnam Raju) and grandson of Subbaraju (Kota Srinivasa Rao). Balaraju lost his mother when he was a child. Raghava Raju brings him up with great care so that he will not miss his mother. He does not consider marrying another lady because he thinks that it might deprive his love for his son.

Balaraju falls in love with a girl, Lahari (Simran) during a flight journey. He also gets his love accepted by everyone. One day, he happens to read his father's diary and realizes that his father had suppressed feelings for a lady called Sravani (Ambika). He wants to get his father married to Sravani along with his marriage. He is even ready to sacrifice his love when Lahari misunderstands his intentions. Knowing his son's broken love, Raghava Raju tries to send Sravani far away so that his son can get married without any problems. But Subbaraju and Balaraju stop this and convince Raghava Raju. Finally, Sravani understands his intentions, and all ends well.

Cast
 Krishnam Raju as Raja Kalidindi Raghava Raju
 Srikanth as Bala Raju
 Simran as Lahari
 Ambika as Sravani
 Kota Srinivasa Rao as Subba Raju
 Chalapathi Rao as Sarvarayudu
 Mallikarjuna Rao as Anjaneyulu
 M. S. Narayana as Sravani's father
 Raja Ravindra as Bala Raju's friend
 Namala Murthy

Soundtrack

Reception 
A critic from Andhra Today opined that "'Maa Naannaki Pelli' is a nice movie built around a thought provoking theme under the able direction of E.V.V.Satyanarayana".

Awards
Nandi Awards - 1997
Best Home-viewing Feature Film - M. Arjuna Raju
Best Male Comedian - M. S. Narayana

References

External links
 

1997 films
1990s Telugu-language films
Indian romantic drama films
Films directed by E. V. V. Satyanarayana
Films scored by Koti
Films set in Delhi
Films shot in Delhi
Films set in Chennai
Films set in Tamil Nadu
Films shot in Tamil Nadu
1997 romantic drama films